The Yaduvanshi Aheer or Yaduvanshi Ahir claim descent from god Krishna of the ancient Yadava clan. The Ahirs have three major classifications - Yaduvanshi, Nandavanshi and Goallavanshi. Yaduvanshi claim descent from Yadu, Nandavansh claim descent from Nanda, the foster father of Krishna and Goallavanshi claim descent from gopi and gopas of Krishna's childhood. 

As per anthropologist Bhrigupati Singh in Classical Hinduism Krishna was from the Yaduvanshi Ahir tribe.

Historians such as P. M. Chandorkar has used epigraphical evidence to argue that Ahirs and Gawlis are representative of the ancient Abhiras and Yadavas tribe mentioned in Sanskrit works.

References

Ahir